The Zig Zag-chair is a chair designed by Gerrit Rietveld sometime between 1930 and 1934.

It is a minimalistic design without legs, made by 4 flat wooden slabs (originally in Elm, now in pine wood) that are merged in a Z-shape using dovetailed and bolted or screwed joints. It was designed for Rietveld's Rietveld Schröder House in Utrecht and is now produced under license In Cherry or Ash by the Italian manufacturer Cassina S.p.A., and others as unlicensed knock-offs.

The Italian brand has tapped One Block Down for a new collaboration with a limited-edition run of 30 pieces seeing the wooden chair covered in metal.

See also
Red and Blue Chair

References

Sources

Chairs
Dutch design
Dutch inventions
Gerrit Rietveld
Individual models of furniture